Klea Scott (born December 25, 1968) is a Panamanian-born Canadian actress, known for her roles on television. She starred in the short-lived CBS police drama Brooklyn South (1997–98), and later was cast as Emma Hollis on the Fox television series Millennium for its third and final season. From 2005 to 2007, she starred in the CBC Television crime drama Intelligence.

Biography
Klea Scott was born December 25, 1968, in Panama City, Panama Canal Zone, and was raised in Canada.

Scott first appeared on the Canadian television show You Can't Do That on Television from 1982 to 1984. The experience encouraged her to switch her focus from dancing to acting. After graduating from high school, she moved to New York City to study acting. She spent a summer at the Williamstown Theater Festival in Massachusetts. Scott then went to college at North Carolina School of the Arts where she earned a Bachelor of Fine Arts degree. On stage, she has performed in All's Well That Ends Well and The Tempest with the New York Shakespeare Festival.

Scott made her network television debut on an episode of the CBS sitcom Cosby before accepting the regular role of Officer Nona Valentine on the CBS police drama Brooklyn South. After this short stint on network television, Scott found herself back doing community theatre, working with her husband, John Langs, a theatrical writer and director.

Scott auditioned for the Fox series Millennium in 1998. The show's producers cast her in the role of FBI Agent Emma Hollis in the third and final season. The series was cancelled in 1999.

She went on to guest star in television shows including ER and Just Shoot Me! and was later cast as Detective Sonia Robbins in the CBS drama series Robbery Homicide Division.

In film, Scott has been seen in supporting roles in movies such as Minority Report and Collateral.

Scott co-starred with Ian Tracey in Intelligence, an award-winning series from Da Vinci's Inquest creator Chris Haddock, which premiered in October 2006 on CBC. A second season aired from October 2007, concluding in December that same year.

In 2017, Scott guest starred in an episode of Grey's Anatomy playing Dominique Eldredge.

Scott appeared in her role as Jillian Howe in Pretty Little Liars.

In 2019, she began playing the role of Dana Booker in the Pretty Little Liars spinoff series Pretty Little Liars: The Perfectionists.

Personal life
Scott has one son, named Captain, born in January 2010.

Filmography

References

External links 

1968 births
Actresses from Ottawa
Black Canadian actresses
Canadian child actresses
Canadian people of Panamanian descent
Canadian television actresses
Living people
Panamanian emigrants to Canada
Zonians